Diary of a Night Watchman is a 2014 South Korean television series starring Jung Il-woo, Ko Sung-hee, Jung Yun-ho and Seo Yea-ji. It aired on MBC from August 4 to October 21, 2014 on Mondays and Tuesdays at 22:00 for 24 episodes.

Plot
Prince Rin found himself orphan when his father the king, under a spell, killed the queen and then committed suicide. Considered unsuitable for the throne, the child prince was sent away from the palace and his older half-brother Gi-san, son of a concubine, was crowned the new king of Joseon.

Twelve years later, Rin , now grown up, spends his days between fun and amorous encounters, hiding the loneliness he feels and his ability to see ghosts, acquired after escaping the attack of a spirit when he was a child. One day, Rin meets Do-ha, a young shaman from Mount Baekdu searching for her older sister. Besides Do-ha, a Taoist priest, Sadam, arrives in Hanyang, chosen by the king to expel an evil spirit that haunts him, actually a result of the sovereign's madness. Twelve years before, as the head of the Yongshin tribe, Sadam was able to revive the dragon god that his people worshiped, seeing it defeated and turned into a statue shortly after by the king, who secretly brought the artifact to the palace and hid it in the basement: therefore, Sadam's goal is to find the statue and to resurrect the dragon god exploiting the negative energy of evil spirits. For this purpose, Sadam convinces the king to reopen a door sealed long ago to prevent resentful ghosts to enter, and the town is again haunted.

Upon learning Sadam's plan, Rin decides to revive the Night Watchmen, a group of soldiers that, at the time of his father, faced monsters and spirits, but were killed with the advent of the new king: by his side there are Do-ha, with whom he falls in love, Kang Moo-seok, a swordsman who initially doesn't believe in the supernatural, and Jo Sang-heon, the former captain of the Night Watchmen. While the battle against Sadam rages, Rin also brings to light the truth behind the death of his parents.

Cast

Main characters
 Jung Il-woo as Rin/Wolgwang 
 Kim Hwi-soo as young Rin
The "bad boy" legitimate heir to the throne who rejects his wealth and honor to live a rebellious life. When Lin gains the ability to see ghosts, he becomes a night watchman. In chasing ghosts and experiencing the plight of citizens firsthand, he eventually learns to be a good prince.

 Ko Sung-hee as Do-ha 
 Lee Chae-mi as young Do-ha
She is imbued with supernatural energy from Mt. Baekdu and can communicate with nature. Her older sister is Yeon-ha.

 Jung Yun-ho as Kang Moo-seok
 Yoo Seung-yong as young Kang Moo-seok
A night watchman who is a cold-hearted man of few words but popular with the ladies.

 Seo Yea-ji as Park Soo-ryeon
 Kang Joo-eun as young Park Soo-ryeon
A young noblewoman who will stop at nothing to become the crown prince's bride. She is the daughter of the Prime Minister and Moo-seok's cousin.

Supporting characters
 Yoon Tae-young as Jo Sang-heon
Head of the Night Watchmen crew.
 Kim Heung-soo as Gi-san
 Lee Tae-woo as young Gi-san
An illegitimate prince who challenges his younger brother Lee Rin for power and makes a political play for the throne. Capricious and vile, he often sees another self who accuses him of being inadequate as king, and instills doubts about the loyalty of his subjects.
 Kim Sung-oh as Sadam
A psychic who worships a serpent monster deep in the heart of Mt. Baekdu. The serpent monster, an imugi, is a mythological creature that starts out as a giant serpent and amasses power to become a dragon. Sadam tries to raise the dormant imugi and harness its power to take over the world.
 Lee Jae-yong as Park Soo-jong
The ambitious Prime Minister, he is the mastermind behind queen Min's death.
 Ko Chang-seok as Fat Minister Jung-seung
Former Prime Minister, killed by Park Soo-jong. He watches over Lee Rin as a ghost.
Lee Se-chang as Eunuch Song
A eunuch who was in charge of Lee Rin before he was killed by king Haejong. He watches over Lee Rin as a ghost.
Kang Ji-woo as Rang
A ghost girl who watches over Lee Rin. Later revealed as Queen Min.
Seo Yi-sook as Dowager Queen  Chungsoo
Rin and Gi-san's grandmother.
Moon Bo-ryung as Mo Yeon-wol
A merchant who helps Sadam.
Jung Woo-sik as Ho-jo
Sadam's servant.
 Shim Eun-jin as Ok-mae
Owner of an inn, she's in love with Sang-heon.
 Ah Young as Hong Cho-hee
A waitress at Ok-mae's inn.
Ahn Jung-hoon as Mr. Chun
He works at Ok-mae's inn.
Jo Dal-hwan as Maeng Sa-kong
Sang-heon's friend, he once was a Night Watchman and is in love with Ok-mae.
Kim So-yeon as Kang In-hwa
Moo-seok's younger sister, she died of smallpox.
Lee Ha-yool as Dae-ho
Moo-seok's friend.

Guest/cameo appearances
 Yoo Da-in as Yeon-ha
Do-ha's older sister and a shaman. She fell in love with king Haejong and offered her soul to Sadam in exchange for the king's heart, becoming the reason why he turned evil. Sadam embodied her soul in the corpse of a woman, who became Mo Yeon-wol.
 Choi Won-young as King Haejong
In his youth, he was once a legendary hero of the people after he and his fellow night watchmen defeated an imugi in Mt. Baekdu. In his days as a warrior, he saves a woman who preserves the energy of Mt. Baekdu, and she falls in love with him at first sight. Haejong is a good king and father to his sons, but the ghost-seeing gift-curse eventually turns him into an evil tyrant.
Song Yi-woo as Queen Min
Rin's mother.
Jeon Hye-young as Sa-wol
Soo-ryeon's maid.
Cho Seung-hee as Young-geun 
Spy woman, appeared in episode 8.
 Hwang Seok-jeong as Dangkol Eomi
Do-ha's spiritual mother.
Alice as Mae-hyang
A gisaeng, all her customers are mysteriously killed.
Kim Kyul as Ghost of unmarried bachelor
A student who loved Mae-hyang, he died without being able to confess his feelings and now kills Mae-hyang's customers.

Ratings

Awards and nominations

International broadcast
It began airing in Japan on cable channel KNTV on December 14, 2014.

It began airing in Thailand on PPTV on March 29, 2015, dubbed as Asawin Rattikal. ("อัศวินรัตติกาล", literally: The Dark Knight).

References

External links
 
Diary of a Night Watchman at MBC Global Media

2014 South Korean television series debuts
2014 South Korean television series endings
MBC TV television dramas
South Korean fantasy television series
South Korean historical television series
Television series by RaemongRaein